Kate name may refer to:

People and fictional characters 

 Kate (given name), a list of people and fictional characters with the given name or nickname
 Gyula Káté (born 1982), Hungarian amateur boxer
 Lauren Kate (born 1981), American author of young adult fiction
 ten Kate, a Dutch toponymic surname originally meaning "at the house"

Arts and entertainment
 Kate (TV series), a British drama series (1970-1972)
 Kate (film), a 2021 American action thriller film
 An alternative title of "Crabbit Old Woman", a poem attributed to Phyllis McCormack
 Kate, a young adult novel by Valerie Sherrard
 "Kate" (Ben Folds Five song), 1997
 "Kate" (Johnny Cash song), 1972
 "Kate", a song by Arty
 "Kate (Have I Come Too Early, Too Late)", a song by Irving Berlin, 1947
 The Kate, American TV series

Ships
 CSS Kate, a Confederate blockade runner during the American Civil War
 , a Union Navy steamer during the American Civil War
 SS Kate (tug), a wooden steamer built in Australia in 1883

Other uses
 Tropical Storm Kate (disambiguation), various hurricanes, typhoons, cyclones and tropical storms
 Nakajima B5N, a Japanese torpedo bomber, Allied reporting name "Kate"
 2156 Kate, an asteroid
 Kate (text editor), a text editor for KDE
 Kate the woodpecker, the mascot of Kate editor
 KATE, a radio station licensed to Albert Lea, Minnesota, United States
 Kâte language, a Papuan language
 Cotter (farmer) house, called Kate in German